Agnes Booth (October 4, 1843 – January 2, 1910), born Marian Agnes Land Rookes, was an Australian-born American actress and in-law of Junius Brutus Booth, Edwin Booth, and – arguably the most notable – John Wilkes Booth, the assassin of Abraham Lincoln.

Biography

Although there are no records of Agnes Booth's birth or her family's residence in Australia, by her own account she was born in Sydney, New South Wales. She migrated to California with her family in 1858, at the age of about 14.

She made her US debut in early 1858 as Agnes Land, performing with her sister Belle at Maguire's Opera House, San Francisco, attracting attention and gaining recognition and managing a season of the Metropolitan theatre in Detroit. In 1861 she married actor Harry A. Perry in San Francisco, but was widowed in 1862. Her six-year apprenticeship with Thomas Maguire allowed her to move from shape actress to leading lady.

In 1865 she moved to New York where she appeared at the Winter Garden Theatre.
As Agnes Perry, in 1866 she joined the Boston Theatre Company, of which she was a member for several years. In 1867, she was married to Junius Brutus Booth Jr. and she performed as Agnes Booth thereafter. 

At the height of her popularity reviews of her performances were effusive. In 1874, the News described her as "the most finished and effective emotional actress at present on the metropolitan stage." In 1889, Belford's Magazine wrote of another "great triumph" by Agnes Booth in Captain Swift. "For painstaking attention to detail, nicety of intonation, and powerful expression, Agnes Booth is in the front rank of leading ladies. We have seen her in many society dramas, and in each she has shown a charming appreciation of all the requirements... The mingled expression of shame, suffering and maternal love in Agnes Booth's face during [one] scene is one not soon to be forgotten. In 1874, she and Junius made a praise-worthy trip to the far west playing San Francisco's California Theater and Piper's Opera House in Virginia City. Her repertoire included Romeo and Juliet, Hunchback, and Lady of Lyons. 

In 1878 she played Madeleine Renaud in the Union Square Theatre's production of A Celebrated Case, the program noting that she had "kindly undertaken this part in order to strengthen the cast." From 1881 to 1891, she was with the Madison Square Company. After 1891, she went to Europe, then returned to the United States where she resided in the artist community of New Rochelle, New York and resumed her work on Broadway in nearby New York City. Booth gained fame for her role in the melodrama The Sporting Duchess (The Derby Winner by Cecil Raleigh) along with fellow actress and New Rochelle neighbor Cora Tanner.

Junius Booth died in 1883, and in 1885 she married John B. Schoeffel, manager of Boston's Tremont theatre. Her last major performance was in L'Arlesienne in 1897.

She died at her home in Brookline, Massachusetts on January 2, 1910.

References

Sources
 Asia Booth Clarke (1882). The Elder and the Younger Booth, Boston: J.R. Osgood and Co.
 McKay and Wingate (1896). Famous American Actors of To-day, New York: T.Y. Crowell.
 Clapp and Edgett (1899). "Players of the Present", Dunlap Society Publication. New York.
 Montrose Jonas Moses (1906). Famous Actor-Families in America, New York: Greenwood Press.

External links
 

1843 births
1910 deaths
Actresses from Sydney
Australian emigrants to the United States
19th-century American actresses
American stage actresses
Actresses from New Rochelle, New York
Actresses from Boston
Agnes
Wikipedia articles incorporating text from A Woman of the Century